Big Brother VIP is a spin-off series of the Australian version of the Dutch reality television franchise Big Brother. The series was announced on 30 March 2021 and is hosted by Sonia Kruger. The series premiered on 1 November 2021.

This season revolves around 12 celebrities living in a house together with no communication with the outside world as they compete for $100,000 charity prize. They were constantly filmed during their time in the house and were not permitted to communicate with those filming them. The format of the series is the same as the current civilian version with emphasis on competition and gameplay. The celebrity housemates will now compete in challenges for power and safety before voting each other out of the house. When only three housemates remained, the Australian public voted to decide which finalist would win the game and win the grand prize for their nominated charity.

History
The first celebrity edition, titled Celebrity Big Brother, aired on Network Ten in 2002 and was won by Dylan Lewis. No further celebrity editions were commissioned before the entire franchise was axed by the network in 2008.

In 2011 it was confirmed that the Big Brother franchise would be revived by Nine Network. Following the conclusion of the 2014 civilian season, rumours had begun circulating that Nine were looking at reviving the Celebrity Big Brother edition of the show for broadcast in 2015 which were later confirmed by host Sonia Kruger. By July 2015, it was reported that the fourth season of The Celebrity Apprentice Australia had replaced the proposed Celebrity Big Brother revival. While it was also said it was possible something could happen the following year in 2016, nothing ever eventuated and the 2014 season became the last season of the franchise to air on Nine.

Format
Big Brother VIP follows the same rebooted format of the series that launched with the twelfth season of the series, which itself resembles the format of the American & Canadian editions of Big Brother - with housemates determining both Nominations and Evictions. The format has emphasis on the competitive aspect of surviving the eviction process. As such, the housemates are permitted to strategise, politic and collude about the nominations and evictions. However, there are still key differences compared to the North American format, most prominently, no "Power of Veto" is included as part of the format (a staple of the American and Canadian shows), and the Australian public deciding the eventual winner - rather than being decided by a Jury formed of evicted housemates.

 Nominations:  At the start of each round, the housemates compete in a "Nomination Challenge". The winner of the competition has the sole power over the nominations. Immediately after the challenge, the winning housemate will be called to the Diary Room by Big Brother to name their nominees, and provide full reasons for their nominations. The number of nominees is determined by how far into the overall game housemates are, as the game starts with three nominees and reduces to two nominees towards the end of the game.
 Eviction: On eviction night, all housemates must vote to evict one of the nominees, with the exception of the nominating housemate (who will only cast a tie-breaker vote, if required), nor do the nominated housemates vote when there are only two nominees (on account of their votes cancelling the other's out). The eviction vote is by secret ballot, with housemates casting their votes orally in the Diary Room to Big Brother, and must provide a reason for their vote. The nominee with the most votes is evicted from the house. 
 Finale: The final housemates will face Australia's vote to determine the winner.

Teams
Following completing a secret mission issued to them by Big Brother, Caitlyn and Ellie earned the right to each become a captain of one of the two teams that the house would be split into. During this team phase of the game the Nomination Challenge saw the two teams competing against each other, with the winning team earning safety for themselves and the team captain being responsible for deciding who to nominate for eviction from the opposing team. The team phase of the game concluded after the second eviction.

Housemates
On 8 August 2021, Channel Seven revealed the 12 celebrities competing in the series.

Episodes

Production
In advance of the series being announced in March 2021, it was confirmed in December 2020 that the show was issued an eviction notice by NSW National Parks & Wildlife Service for the North Head site used as the location of the house for the previous two series of the civilian series over concerns for local wildlife due to concerns from increased traffic and attention to the site. In July 2021, it was confirmed that the site of the new Big Brother house used for the series would be constructed in the White Pavilion at the Sydney Olympic Park at Homebush Bay.

In June 2021, it was confirmed that the series would be extended in some capacity due to the tenth season of Australia's Got Talent being delayed due to COVID-19 pandemic restrictions that came into effect in Sydney shortly before production was set to begin.

Filming commenced on 30 July 2021 and wrapped on 20 August 2021 after 22 days of filming.  Unlike previous seasons that have aired on Seven, the finale was not broadcast live and was pre-recorded with the rest of the season. All three possible outcomes were filmed and the result of the vote by the Australian public determined which was aired.

In October 2021, a second season of Big Brother VIP was announced at Seven's 2022 Upfront presentation — prior to the broadcast of the first season — and was slated to air in 2022. However, it was announced in February 2022 the series was "not proceeding".

Katie Hopkins controversy
In July 2021 Katie Hopkins, who was set to appear on the show after appearing on the fifteenth season of Celebrity Big Brother UK in 2015, made multiple posts on Instagram mocking several lockdown measures in place in Sydney, as well as stating she was intentionally not following rules in place. Her entry into the country sparked backlash due to the number of Australians stranded overseas due to state intake limits that were in place as well as the controversial nature of Hopkins as a public figure. Seven condemned the statements she had made and also confirmed she would no longer be a part of the series. Her visa was ultimately canceled, she was fined $1,000 and was also escorted to Sydney Airport by police on July 19, 2021, for deportation back to the UK. Due to a pay-or-play clause in her contract, Hopkins was still paid her full appearance fee.

International broadcast
The series was broadcast in New Zealand on TVNZ 2 and TVNZ OnDemand, with episodes being released the day after their broadcast in Australia. The series was later broadcast in the UK, under the localised title Celebrity Big Brother Australia, on E4 starting on 6 February 2022, however it was removed from the schedule after airing four episodes but continued to be released via the All 4 on-demand service.

Voting history
 This housemate was nominated for eviction.
 This housemate was the nominating Housemate on this round.
 This housemate was immune from this round of eviction due to a twist.
 This housemate was on the winning team in the challenge and is immune for this round of eviction. 
 This housemate was not in the Main House and did not participate in this round of eviction.
 This housemate was originally nominated but was saved from eviction.

Team Phase
For the first two rounds of eviction, the housemates competed in two teams.
 The Jenner-ators (denoted by ), led by Caitlyn
 Hard Knocks (denoted by ), led by Ellie. 
The winning team would win immunity, with their captain earning the power over nominations. Danny, who entered after the final team challenge, was not assigned to either team. After the second eviction on Day 6, the game reverted to the regular format, with the Housemates playing as individuals.

Notes

Ratings
Ratings data is from OzTAM and represents the viewership from the 5 largest Australian metropolitan centres (Sydney, Melbourne, Brisbane, Perth and Adelaide).

References

External links 

Celebrity Big Brother
Big Brother (Australian TV series)
Seven Network original programming
2021 Australian television seasons
2021 Australian television series debuts
2021 Australian television series endings
Australian television series based on Dutch television series
English-language television shows